The CWA/AWA International Tag Team Championship (also identified in Pro Wrestling Illustrated magazine as the Mid-Southern International Tag Team Championship and the AWA International Tag Team Championship) was a professional wrestling tag team title defended in the Continental Wrestling Association. It was created in 1985 from the CWA's partnership with the American Wrestling Association. The title was abandoned in 1987 when the CWA was renamed the Championship Wrestling Association, and the original Continental titles were abandoned or unified with others.

Title history

See also
CWA/AWA International Heavyweight Championship

Notes

References
Wrestling-Titles.com
1986 and 1987 Mid-South Coliseum results - ProWrestlingHistory.com

Specific

Continental Wrestling Association championships
American Wrestling Association championships
Tag team wrestling championships